Otacity Ostenaco (or "Bighead"; c. 1710 – 1780) was a Cherokee leader and warrior of the 18th century.  By his thirties, he had assumed the warrior rank of Utsidihi (Mankiller), and the title of the Tassite of Great Tellico. He then rose to assume the higher Cherokee rank of Cherokee  chief warrior or skiagusta, orator, and leading figure in diplomacy with British colonial authorities. The name Otacity has a variety of spellings.

Birth and early life 

He was born in the thickly-settled Cherokee township of Tellico. It has been conjectured that he was born into the Ani-waya(Wolf) clan, the one associated in particular with bearing numerous warriors. He was often referred to among white colonists as Judd's Friend, referring to his relationship of a trader by that name After the Creek Indians seized an opportunity to lay Tellico under assault,  in 1753 he moved to Tomotley.

French and Indian War 
During the French and Indian War, Ostenaco at first aided the Colony of Virginia against the French and the Shawnee, traveling over 3,500 miles on foot and by canoe.  In 1756, he led 130 Cherokees in the Sandy Creek Expedition, a joint Virginia-Cherokee campaign on the frontier of what is now West Virginia. In 1757 and 1758, his war party raided the French stronghold at Fort Duquesne (present day Pittsburgh).

Timberlake Expedition

Background 

An expeditionary party, made up of Lieutenant Henry Timberlake, Sergeant Thomas Sumter, John McCormack (an interpreter), and an unnamed servant, arrived in the Overhill Cherokee town of Tomotley on December 20, where they were greeted by Ostenaco, one of the leading men in the town, who was visiting from Keowee. After spending several days in Tomotley as guests of Ostenaco, Timberlake and his interpreter proceeded to the Overhill mother town of Chota, where a number of chiefs had gathered in the town's large council-house. Ostenaco gave a speech and ceremonially buried a hatchet in the ground, symbolizing a state of peace between the English and the Cherokee.  Afterward, Timberlake took part in a peace ceremony in which he smoked several ceremonial pipes with the gathered chiefs, a practice Timberlake personally found "very disagreeable," but participated without openly complaining.

Journey to London 

On January 2, 1762, Timberlake returned to Tomotley with Ostenaco, his assignment largely completed.  Timberlake spent the next few weeks studying Cherokee habits and making notes for his maps of the Overhill country.  At the end of January, rumors began trickling in from Cherokee scouts of renewed hostilities with rival tribes to the north.  Timberlake grew anxious and begged Ostenaco to guide him back to Virginia.  Ostenaco reluctantly agreed, and the party set out on March 10, 1762,  arriving in Williamsburg in early April.

While in Williamsburg, Timberlake and Ostenaco attended a dinner party at William & Mary College at which Ostenaco professed his desire to meet the king of England. A young Thomas Jefferson, then a student at the college, later wrote of Ostenaco:

"I knew much of the great Outassete (Ostenaco), the warrior and orator of the Cherokee. He was always the guest of my father on his journeys to and from Williamsburg. I was in his camp when he made his great farewell oration to his people the evening before he departed for England. The moon was in full splendour, and to her he seemed to address himself in his prayers for his own safety on the voyage and that of his people during his absence. His sounding voice, distinct articulation, animated action, and the solemn silence of his people at their several fires, filled me with awe and veneration, although I did not understand a single word he uttered." 

In May 1762, Timberlake, Sumter, and three distinguished Cherokee leaders, including Ostenaco, departed for London. Arriving in early June, the Cherokee were an immediate attraction, drawing crowds all over the city. The poet Oliver Goldsmith queued for over three hours to meet the Cherokee, and offered him a gift. Ostenaco thanked him by kissing him on both cheeks, leaving them smeared with ochre, which caused bystanders to laugh, and discomforted Goldsmith, who didn't expect that 'natives' would apply makeup as heavy as that common in European society.  It may have been Goldsmith who suggested to his friend Joshua Reynolds to paint Ostenaco's portrait. Reynolds was not satisfied with the result, as he failed to find a solution to the need for harmonizing neoclassical principles about conveying something universal while catering to contemporary tastes in individualized features. Thus he chose to ignore his subject's tattoos and ochre makeup, while depicting his wampum and hairstyle against a forested  mountain backdrop. As a result he put the portrait, entitled 'Syacust Ukah', into storage.   

The Cherokees returned to North America with Thomas Sumter in August 1762. The trip secured for Ostenaco lasting fame on both sides of the Atlantic.

American Revolution 

During the Second Cherokee War, Ostenaco was the chief war leader of the Cherokee Lower Towns in western South Carolina/northeast Georgia, and was allied with the British forces. In 1776 he led their attack against the Province of Georgia. After the destruction of the Lower Towns in the retaliation which followed, Ostenaco led his people west. The majority resettled in what is now far northern Georgia, with Ustanali as their chief town. Some followed him into the Cherokee–American wars with Dragging Canoe, and settled with him in the Chickamauga (now Chattanooga, Tennessee) region at the town of Ooltewah (Ultiwa'i, "owl's nest") on Ooltewah Creek (in the modern Hamilton County, Tennessee).

Ostenaco died at the home of his grandson, Richard Timberlake, the son of Henry Timberlake and Ostenaco's daughter, at Ooltewah in 1780.

Notes

Citations

Sources

Bibliography
 
 

1703 births
1780 deaths
18th-century Cherokee people
People of pre-statehood Tennessee
People of Virginia in the French and Indian War